The Story of Diva and Flea is a 2015 children's book written by Mo Willems and it is illustrated by Tony DiTerlizzi. It was first published by Hyperion Books for Children.

Plot
A chapter book targeted to ages 6–8, the book is about a small house-loving dog and a large wandering cat who become friends in Paris.  It is based on a real pair of animals that the author met in Paris.

Reception
Publishers Weekly gave the book a positive review and noted it was "instantly fit for translation" to film, and a different PW column called it "a small modern classic".  In a starred review, School Library Journal praised DiTerlizzi's illustrations.  The Wall Street Journal compared it to the 1970 film The Aristocats.  The New York Times called it a "lighthearted valentine to Paris".

References

2015 children's books
American picture books
Fictional dogs
Fictional cats
Books about Paris
Books about cats
Dogs in literature